This is a list of fuel-burn power stations in Denmark; fuel types are fossil or biomass.

Thermal

Non-thermal
For offshore power stations, see List of offshore wind farms in Denmark.

See also 
 Energy in Denmark

Denmark
 

Lists of buildings and structures in Denmark